The Taewon Yi clan is a Korean clans. Their Bon-gwan is in Taiyuan, Shanxi, China. According to the census held in 2000, the number of Taiyuan Lee clan was 670. He was originally from Taiyuan during the Song dynasty in China, and he worked as government officer during Chungnyeol of Goryeo period. His successor supported Taejo of Joseon, and the successor was appointed as Gongsin (功臣) in Joseon.

See also 
 Korean clan names of foreign origin

References

External links 
 

Korean clan names of Chinese origin

Yi clans